Carl Stanley Knowles (February 24, 1910 – September 4, 1981) was an American basketball player who competed in the 1936 Summer Olympics.

He was part of the American basketball team, which won the gold medal. He played two matches including the final.

He played college basketball at UCLA.

External links
profile
USA Basketball All-Time Roster.
Antiques Roadshow

1910 births
1981 deaths
Amateur Athletic Union men's basketball players
Basketball players at the 1936 Summer Olympics
Medalists at the 1936 Summer Olympics
Olympic gold medalists for the United States in basketball
UCLA Bruins men's basketball players
United States men's national basketball team players
American men's basketball players